Object-100 Utes (Utyos) or Sotka is a Russian Navy anti-ship missile coastal defense division built in Soviet times, using bunker TEL (similar to Nike Hercules SAM ABM) with a pair of SS-N-3 Shaddock P-35B 4K44B (same used operated on Redut complex) SS-N-3b Shaddock 3M44 Progress, can also launch different ones like P-6 P-35B S-35.

Modern times

Utes, or Sotka, Object-100 missiles are situated right on a cliff, with the sea beneath, 50–100 m from sea level, stationed at two firing positions (bunker TEL) alongside the rest of the base facilities.

In April 2017, crews of a 4K44 Utyos (SS-C-1B Sepal) stationary coastal defense missile system in Crimea test fired a P-35 (SS-C-3) cruise missile at a sea target.

Operation 
 main 
 P-35B 4K44B 3M44 Progress in bunker TEL (similar to Nike Hercules or North Korean coastal AShM sites).

Operator 
  
 VMF   Crimean Armed Forces 
  BRaV CmF ВМФ ЧмФ БРВ (Black Sea Fleet Coastal Missile Forces),  Crimean Navy

See also 
SS-N-3 Shaddock
Bastion-P - and silo K-300S P-800 variant .
R-500 9M728
Kh-35 3M24 SS-N-25, Bal
3M-54 Klub

References

Military in Crimea
Installations of the Russian Navy
Installations of the Soviet Navy